Kazi Harun is a Bangladeshi make-up artist. He won National Film Award for Best Make-up Artist for working in Hridoy Theke Hridoy in 1994. He worked in over 100 films.

Biography
Harun made his debut in Dhallywood with Milon in 1965. Later, he worked in films like Beder Meye Josna, Anya Jibon, Hridoy Theke Hridoy, Shangkhamala, Golapi Ekhom Dhakay, Jibon Sangsar and more. He was conferred National Film Award for Best Make-up Artist for working in Hridoy Theke Hridoy.

Harun suffered a stroke in 2009. He had to sell his gold medal that he received as his recognition as National Film Award for Best Make-up Artist in 2010 for his daughter's marriage expenses. He had to start begging in 2011. He was granted  BDT 5,00,000 on 14 September 2019 from Bangladeshi Prime Minister Sheikh Hasina for his medical expenses.

Selected filmography
 Beder Meye Josna
 Anya Jibon
 Hridoy Theke Hridoy
 Shangkhamala
 Golapi Ekhom Dhakay
 Jibon Sangsar

Awards and nominations

References

External links
 

Living people
Bangladeshi make-up artists
Best Makeup National Film Award (Bangladesh) winners
Year of birth missing (living people)